Chopper City Records is a record label founded by CEO and rapper Christopher "B.G." Dorsey and Co-CEO Carol Dorsey in Metairie, Louisiana.

Dorsey, signed an independent deal for his Chopper City Records with Koch Records in 2003. After Hurricane Katrina, Chopper City Records had relocated to Detroit, Michigan but later relocated back to Louisiana in Destrehan. B.G. and the roster completed their contracts with Koch in 2007 and B.G. signed a solo deal with Atlantic Records. In August 2010 B.G. changed the labels name to Chopper City Music. In 2010, B.G. released the " Moneyside / Murderside" mixtape which heavily featured C.C.G.G (short for Chopper City Gorilla Gang).

Releases

Upcoming releases

Unreleased Albums
Hakim - Street Poetry (only the Promo was released in 2003)
Gar - All Or Nothing
Snipe - Tha Take Ova
Chopper City Records - The Compilation (Vol. 1)

See also
 List of record labels

External links
 Official Chopper City Records Website

References

Hip hop record labels
American record labels
Atlantic Records
Record labels established in 2001
Gangsta rap record labels